Leslie Combs may refer to: 

Leslie Combs (soldier and politician) (1793–1881), U.S. veteran of the War of 1812 and Kentucky politician
Leslie Combs II (1901–1990), American equestrian
Leslie Combs III (1852–1940), American diplomat
Leslie A. Combs (born 1958), Kentucky politician